Coleophora ledi is a moth of the family Coleophoridae. It is found from Fennoscandia and northern Russia to the Pyrenees and the Alps. In the east, it ranges to Japan. Outside of Eurasia, it is known from North America where it is found in eastern Canada, Michigan, and Alaska.

The larvae feed on Ledum palustre, Ledum groenlandicum and Chamaedaphne calyculata. They create a strongly curved lobe case. Some very large leaf fragments are found in the central part. Young larvae overwinter in small cases. When feeding and larval growth are resumed in early spring, the larvae enlarge their cases by adding a series of rings of leaf epidermis with pieces sticking out on all sides. They make underside mines that are easily detected as large brown blotches visible from the upper surface of the leaves. The larvae mature in late April and early May feeding on the previous year's foliage. The adults emerge in early to mid-May and are possibly diurnal.

References

ledi
Moths described in 1860
Moths of Asia
Moths of Europe
Moths of North America